Bruno Valencony (born 16 June 1968) is a French former professional footballer who played as a goalkeeper.

Honours
Nice
 Coupe de France: 1997

References

1968 births
Living people
Sportspeople from Allier
French footballers
Footballers from Auvergne-Rhône-Alpes
Association football goalkeepers
Ligue 1 players
Ligue 2 players
INF Vichy players
SC Bastia players
OGC Nice players